Majruseh (also Romanized as Majrūseh) is a village in Beradust Rural District, Sumay-ye Beradust District, Urmia County, West Azerbaijan Province, Iran. At the 2006 census, its population was 103, in 19 families.

References 

Populated places in Urmia County